Crawfish pie is a type of baked savory pie common in the Cajun and Creole cuisine of Louisiana. It is similar in appearance to a pot pie and contains crawfish. The dish is mentioned in the Hank Williams song "Jambalaya (On the Bayou)", along with other common Cajun dishes such as the eponymous jambalaya and gumbo.

See also
 Étouffée
 List of seafood dishes
 Natchitoches meat pie

References

Cajun cuisine
Crayfish dishes
American pies